Denis Agre (Bulgarian: Денис Агре) (born March 10, 1988) is a Bulgarian professional basketball player, who last played for Lukoil Academic in the Bulgarian League, as a power forward or center. Agre was born in Sofia.

Career 
Agre played college basketball for Central Arizona College and Pepperdine. In 2011, he returned to Bulgaria to play for BC Levski Sofia. In 2012, he signed with Spartak Pleven. After two years abroad, in 2015 he signed with BC Yambol.

References

External links
http://bgbasket.com/en//player.php?id=4926
http://basketball.realgm.com/player/Denis-Agre/Summary/8422
http://basketball.eurobasket.com/player/Denis_Agre/77431

Living people
1988 births
Basketball players from Sofia
BC Levski Sofia players
BC Yambol players
Bulgarian expatriate basketball people in the United States
Bulgarian men's basketball players
Centers (basketball)
Central Arizona Vaqueros men's basketball players
PBC Academic players
Pepperdine Waves men's basketball players
Power forwards (basketball)